Lesbian, gay, bisexual, transgender (LGBT) rights in Kosovo have improved in recent years, most notably with the adoption of the new Constitution, banning discrimination based on sexual orientation. Kosovo remains one of few Muslim-majority countries where LGBT pride parades are held annually. 

The Government of Kosovo is supportive of the country's LGBT community. In late 2013, the Parliament Assembly passed a bill to create a coordinating group for the LGBT community. On 17 May 2014, well-known politicians and diplomats, including British Ambassador Ian Cliff and several local LGBT organizations took to the streets of Pristina to march against homophobia. The event was welcomed by the European Union office in Kosovo, as well as by the government itself. A large LGBT flag covered the front side of the government building that night. The first-ever gay pride parade in Kosovo was held in Pristina on 17 May 2016, in which a few hundred people marched through the streets of the capital. The march was also attended by President Hashim Thaçi as well as the British and U.S. ambassadors to Kosovo.

Law regarding same-sex sexual activity

Ottoman Empire 
In 1858, the Ottoman Empire, then in control of Kosovo, legalized same-sex intercourse.

Yugoslavia

The Yugoslav Criminal Code of 1929 banned "lewdness against the order of nature" (anal intercourse). The Socialist Federal Republic of Yugoslavia also restricted the offense to same-sex anal intercourse, with the maximum sentence reduced to 1 to 2 years' imprisonment in 1959.

In 1994, male same-sex sexual intercourse became legal in the Autonomous Province of Kosovo and Metohija when it was a part of the Federal Republic of Yugoslavia.

UNMIK period
In 2004, during the United Nations Interim Administration Mission in Kosovo (UNMIK) period, the legal age of consent was set at 14 regardless of the individual's gender or sexual orientation, and all sexual offenses were made gender-neutral.

Independent era
Kosovo declared independence from Serbia in 2008. Same-sex sexual intercourse has remained legal. This period has also seen an increasing visibility for the LGBT community, and discussions surrounding such issues have become more mainstream. In 2008, the Constitution of Kosovo was promulgated, containing provisions outlawing discrimination on the basis of sexual orientation, amongst others.

Recognition of same-sex relationships
In 2014, the President of the Constitutional Court said that Kosovo de jure allows same-sex marriage. Article 144(3) of the Constitution of Kosovo requires the Constitutional Court to approve any amendments to the Constitution so as to ensure they do not infringe upon the civil rights previously guaranteed. Article 14 of the Law on Family (Serbian: Zakon o porodici) defines marriage as a "legally registered community of two persons of different sexes," though Kosovo gay rights activists have argued this contradicts the wording of the Constitution and have called on same-sex couples to challenge the law in court.

On 7 July 2020, Minister of Justice Selim Selimi announced that the new Civil Code would allow for same-sex civil partnerships, which the Government of Kosovo planned to introduce within a few months. The move was criticised by some LGBT rights groups because it entrenched the legal distinction between opposite-sex and same-sex couples. If the civil code is passed, a special law for civil unions will be required. The draft Civil Code was rejected by the Assembly on 16 March 2022. It is unclear at present if the bill will be presented for another vote.

Discrimination protections
Article 24 of the Constitution of Kosovo bans discrimination on a number of grounds, including sexual orientation. Kosovo is one of the few states in Europe with a constitutional ban on discrimination on the basis of sexual orientation. The wording states: 

The Anti-Discrimination Law of 2004 (Serbian: Zakon protiv diskriminacije) passed by the Kosovo Assembly bans discrimination on the basis of sexual orientation in a variety of fields, including employment, membership of organizations, education, the provision of goods and services, social security and access to housing. The definition of discrimination in this law explicitly includes direct and indirect discrimination, as well as harassment, victimization and segregation.

On 26 May 2015, the Parliament Assembly approved amendments adding gender identity to Kosovo's anti-discrimination law. The amendments took effect in July 2015.

In April 2019, the new Criminal Code of Kosovo went into force, with stronger protections for LGBT citizens. The law provides additional penalties for the commission of a hate crime motivated by the victim's or victims' sexual orientation or gender identity.

Despite these legal protections, LGBT people tend to avoid reporting discrimination or abuse cases to the police. A total of 10 bias-motivated crimes against LGBT people were reported to the authorities in 2019, with a further 13 reported to LGBT organizations only. In February 2019, authorities initiated a case against an official at the Ministry of Justice who had called for LGBT people to be beheaded. Police took him into custody.

Transgender rights
Transgender people are not allowed to legally change their gender in Kosovo, even if they have undergone sex reassignment surgery.

In 2017, a Kosovar citizen, Blert Morina, submitted a court case, seeking to change his name and gender on official identification documents. His request was rejected by Kosovo's Civil Registration Agency. His lawyer, Rina Kika, said he had requested a constitutional review of the agency's decision in July 2018. In December 2019, the Basic Court of Pristina ruled in Morina's favour, affirming his right to change both his name and sex marker on his identification documents. Kika said that "for the first time the court has decided to recognize the right to gender identity without offering evidence for surgical intervention or any medical change". The Ministry of Justice and the Civil Registration Agency have stated that the judgment will not be considered precedent, and other transgender people will have to go through a similar court procedure.

Military service

Lesbian, gay, and bisexual people are allowed to serve openly in the military. However, they may face discrimination by peers when serving openly.

Blood donation
According to a 2018 guideline for "Blood Donation Week", those who have "intimate relationships with the same sex" cannot donate blood.

Living conditions

An LGBT rights group, the Center for Social Emancipation, describes gay life in Kosovo as being "underground" and mostly secretive. There are no known gay clubs or bars in Kosovo, though one briefly opened in Pristina in 2011.

According to a 2015 survey conducted by the National Democratic Institute, 81% of LGBT Kosovars said they had been subject to psychological abuse, and 29% reported being victim of physical violence.

Events celebrating the International Day Against Homophobia, Transphobia and Biphobia have been organized in Kosovo since 2007. The first pride parade occurred in Pristina in May 2016, with attendance from President Hashim Thaçi and British and American diplomats. The annual Pride Week has been held in Pristina since 2017. In 2018, Mayor Shpend Ahmeti participated. During the event's third edition in October 2019, participants started at the Skanderbeg Square, making their way down Mother Teresa Boulevard to Zahir Pajaziti Square, passing the government and parliament buildings and other landmarks of the city, with the slogan "Whoever your heart beats for" (Për kon t'rreh zemra). The events have been held without incidence, and consist of various artistic exhibitions, parties, conferences, discussions and a parade.

LGBT rights movement in Kosovo
There are currently several local LGBT rights organisations in Kosovo. Among the most notable are the Center for Equality and Liberty (CEL), the Center for Social Group Development (CSGD), and the Center for Social Emancipation (QESh).

Summary table

See also

Politics of Kosovo
LGBT rights in Europe
Age of consent in Europe

Notes

References

External links
 
 

Law of Kosovo
Human rights in Kosovo
Kosovo